Leava is the largest village in the chiefdom of Sigave, on the French Pacific island of Futuna, part of the Wallis and Futuna island group. It is also the administrative centre of Sigave.

Overview
Leava is located on the shore of Sigave Bay in the centre of the island's west coast, and has a population of 322.

References

Populated places in Wallis and Futuna